Streptomyces platensis is a bacterium species from the genus of Streptomyces which has been isolated from soil. Streptomyces platensis produces oxytetracycline, platensimycin, migrastatin, isomigrastatin, platencin, dorrigocin A, dorrigocin B and terramycine.

Further reading

See also 
 List of Streptomyces species

References

External links
Type strain of Streptomyces platensis at BacDive -  the Bacterial Diversity Metadatabase	

platensis
Bacteria described in 1956